George Ladd was an American silversmith, active in New York City from 1846 to 1851 and San Francisco, California from 1856 to 1861.

References 
 "Ewer by George Ladd", De Young Museum.
 "George Ladd", Sterling Flatware Fashions.
 "George Ladd (1856-1861) Silver Ewer", Witherells Auctions.
 Ruby Lane Auctions.
 "Rare California coin silver ewer by George Ladd", Barneby's.

American silversmiths